Cosmiosophista is a genus of moth in the family Cosmopterigidae. It consists of only one species, Cosmiosophista trachyopa, which is found in New Guinea.

References

External links
Natural History Museum Lepidoptera genus database

Antequerinae
Monotypic moth genera